In linguistics, free variation is the phenomenon of two (or more) sounds or forms appearing in the same environment without a change in meaning and without being considered incorrect by native speakers.

Sociolinguists argue that describing such variation as "free" is very often a misnomer, since variation between linguistic forms is usually constrained probabilistically by a range of systematic social and linguistic factors, not unconstrained as the term "free variation" suggests. The term remains in use in studies focused primarily on language as systems (e.g. phonology, morphology, syntax), however, since "[t]he fact that variation is 'free' does not imply that it is totally unpredictable, but only that no grammatical principles govern the distribution of variants."

Effects
When phonemes are in free variation, speakers are sometimes strongly aware of the fact (especially if such variation is noticeable only across a dialectal or sociolectal divide), and will note, for example, that tomato is pronounced differently in British and American English ( and  respectively), or that either has two pronunciations that are distributed fairly randomly. However, only a very small proportion of English words show such variations. In the case of different realizations of the same phoneme, however, free variation is exceedingly common and, along with differing intonation patterns, variation in realization is the most important single feature in the characterization of regional accents.

English's deep orthography and the language's wide variety of accents often cause confusion, even for native speakers, on how written words should be pronounced. That allows for a significant degree of free variation to occur in English.

English examples

Phonology
The rhotic consonant  is in a free variation between the alveolar approximant, retroflex approximant, alveolar flap and alveolar trill, although all of these save for the first one are considered dialectal and rare.

Pronunciation
Pronunciation of many English words may vary depending on the dialect and the speaker. Although individual speakers may prefer one or the other pronunciation and one may be more common in some dialects than others, many forms can often be encountered within a single dialect and sometimes even within a single idiolect.
In some words, some speakers might use a different vowel than the others. This includes words like:
Pronouncing a word with a different consonant or using a completely different pronunciation is also sometimes found in English. This can be found in words like:
schedule, which may be pronounced either with the  consonant cluster or the  sound. The former is more common in American English, the latter in British English; with /sk/ and /ʃ/ phonemically distinct in both varieties (e.g. scout/shout, skin/shin), identical spelling obscures the fact that different phonological structures underlie the phonetic contrast;

Grammar
Years from 2010 onwards can be expressed in English as either, e.g., two thousand ten or twenty ten.

See also

 Allomorph
 Allophone
 Complementary distribution
 Contrastive distribution
 Phoneme
 Sociolinguistics
 Variable rules analysis

References 

Phonology